Noel Mitchell is an Irish retired hurler who played as a midfielder for the Offaly senior team.

Born in Kinnitty, County Offaly, Mitchell first played competitive hurling in his youth. He made his senior debut with Offaly during the 1983-84 National League and immediately became a regular member of the team. During his career Mitchell won one Leinster medal as a non-playing substitute.

At club level Mitchell played with Kilcormac–Killoughey.

His retirement came following the conclusion of the 1984-85 National League.

Honours

Team

Offaly
Leinster Senior Hurling Championship (1): 1984 (sub)

References

Living people
Kilcormac-Killoughey hurlers
Offaly inter-county hurlers
Year of birth missing (living people)